This is a list of songs which topped the Billboard Mainstream Top 40 chart in 2001.

During 2001, a total of 14 singles hit number-one on the charts.

See also
2001 in music

Billboard charts
United States Mainstream Top 40
Mainstream Top 40 2001